Belinda Martínez Miranda is a Mexican voice actress who was the Spanish voice of Fujiko Mine in the Mexican/Latin American dub of Lupin III. She also was the Mexican/Latin American voice of Queen Beryl and Haruka Tenou/Uranus in Sailor Moon. Her speciality are villainesses or tough young women (although in the past she's usually taken minor roles in the Spanish dubs of her films, i.e. Westworld and M*A*S*H).

She is married to fellow voice actor Benjamín Rivera.

Filmography
Haruka Tenoh/ Sailor Uranus in Sailor Moon S
Queen Beryl in Sailor Moon
Vanessa in Lupin III: Strange Psychokinetic Strategy (film) (2006)
Vanessa in La Guerra del Dolar (2006)
Vanessa in El Mal Día de Vanessa (2005)
Vanessa in Maldición en Tokio (2005)
Vanessa in Adios, Nostradamus (2005)
Vanessa in Isla de Matadores (2005)
Vanessa in Muerto o Vivo (2005)
Vanessa in ¡Quema, Zantetsuken! (2004)
Vanessa in Viaje al Peligro (2004)
Vanessa in El Misterio de Mamo (2003)
Annie in Pokémon Heroes (2003)
Vanessa in The Pursuit of Harimao's Treasure (2002)
Vanessa in El Secreto de Twilight Gemini (2002)
Vanessa in El Castillo de Cagliostro (2002)
Counselor Deanna Troi in Viaje a las Estrellas: Némesis (2002)
Yaddle in La Guerra de las Galaxias-Episodio I: La Amenaza Fantasma (1999)
Panther in Saber Marionette J (1998–1999)
Narrator in Casshan: Robot Hunter (1996)
Vanessa in Adios, Dama Liberdad (1996)
Dira in Dangaioh (1996)
La Reina Beryl in Sailor Moon (1996)
Patricia Haruna in Sailor Moon (1996–1997)
Emu Hino/Fu Chinran in Crying Freeman (1994–2003)
Vanessa in The Plot of the Fuma Clan (1994)
Vanessa in Lupin III (1994–1999)
Additional voices in El Puño de la Estrella del Norte: La Película (1991)
Pvt. Vasquez in Aliens (1986)
Ginger in Terminator (1984)
Ilia in Viaje a las Estrellas: La Película (1979)
Japanese lady in M*A*S*H* (1978)
Beru Lars in La Guerra de las Galaxias (1977)
Dance hall girl in Oeste Mundo (1973)
Lady Capuleto in Romeo y Julieta (1968)
Cordie Biddle in El Millonario Felíz (1967)
Joy Adamson in Born Free (1966)
Uhura (first voice) in Viaje a las Estrellas (1966–1968) (later replaced by Anabel Mendez)
Julie Olson in Dias de Nuestras Vidas (1965-) (her debut role)
Olive Stinkleton in Kitty Is Not a Cat''

References

Living people
Mexican voice actresses
Year of birth missing (living people)
Place of birth missing (living people)